The 2022 UCI Mountain Bike season was the seventeenth season of the UCI Mountain Bike season. The 2022 season began on 15 January with the Momentum Medical Scheme Attakwas Extreme presented by Biogen in South Africa and ended in December 2022.

Events

January

February

March

April

May

June

July

August

September

October

November

December

Copa de España XCM 2022

General classification

2022 UCI Mountain Bike World Cup

Downhill

XCO

XCC

E-MTB

XCE

2022 UCI Mountain Bike World Championships

Cross–Country Olympic (XCO)

Cross–Country Olympic Short Circuit (XCC)

E–MTB Cross–Country

Cross–Country Olympic (XCO) U23

Cross–Country Olympic (XCO) Junior

Downhill (DHI)

Downhill (DHI) Junior

Cross–Country Team Relay (XCR)

2022 UCI Mountain Bike Marathon World Championships

2022 UCI Mountain Bike Eliminator World Championships

2022 UCI Pump Track World Championships

Continental Championships

Asian Continental Championships

XCO

DHI

XCE

XCR

American Continental Championships

Downhill

XCO

XCE

XCC

XCM

Enduro

XCR

African Continental Championships

XCO

2022 European Mountain Bike Championships

XCO

XCC

XCE

XCM

XCR

DHI

Oceania Continental Championships

XCO

Downhill

National Championships

XCO

XCC Short Track

XCE

XCM

E-Bike

Pump Track

Downhill

Enduro

4X

SNO

XCR

References

UCI Mountain Bike World Cup
season